Rattigan is a surname. Notable people with this surname include:

Alf Rattigan (1911–2000), Australian public servant
Benedict Rattigan (born 1965), English writer and filmmaker
Billie Rattigan (1932–2019), Irish footballer
Colin Rattigan (born 1961), British athlete
Cyril Rattigan (1884–1916), English cricketer and British Army officer
Errol Rattigan (born 1956), Jamaican cricketer
Henry Adolphus Rattigan (1864–1920), British judge
Joseph A. Rattigan (1920–2007), American politician
Kelly Rattigan, Australian architect
Leon Rattigan (born 1987), British wrestler
Nick Rattigan (born 1992), American musician
Terence Rattigan (1911–1977), British playwright and screenwriter
Thomas Rattigan (born 1937), American businessman
William Henry Rattigan (1842–1904), British politician
Yana Rattigan (born 1987), British wrestler

See also
Ratigan